Thomas Hurka (born 1952) is a Canadian philosopher who holds the Jackman Distinguished Chair in Philosophical Studies at the University of Toronto and who taught previously, from 1978 to 2002, at the University of Calgary.   He is a leading defender of virtue ethics.

Education and career

After graduating from the University of Toronto Schools, he received a BA at the University of Toronto and a BPhil and DPhil from Oxford University.

He was elected a Fellow of the Royal Society of Canada in 2001.

Philosophical work

Hurka has published works on a number of topics, including the topics of goodness, virtue, and ethics. His philosophy focuses on the well-rounded life. He cited that goods, which come in four basic categories - pleasure, knowledge, achievement, and virtue - matter more the less of them you have. In his theory, he stressed that it is more appropriate to seek a balanced variety of them all instead of devoting oneself to one kind. His conception of virtue is different from the view that an agent ought to maximize their own good, which requires being virtuous. Instead, Hurka stressed that "agents ought to maximize the good of all, which requires conventionally right action, and as a side effect can maximize their own good."

Hurka has also studied the ethics of fighting Global Warming. He maintained that if we reject the notion that individuals should only pursue their own self-interest, then we can assign ethical standing to a wider range of beings besides ourselves. This is significant in addressing global warming because it morally pushes towards strategies of avoiding instead of adapting to climate change.

References

External links
Thomas Hurka homepage

Living people
Academic staff of the University of Toronto
Alumni of the University of Oxford
Canadian philosophers
Canadian ethicists
Place of birth missing (living people)
1952 births